The so-called Molotov Line (Liniya Molotova) comprised a system of border fortified regions built in the Soviet Union in the years 1940–1941 along its new western borders. These border revisions resulted of the occupation of the Baltic States, Eastern Poland and Bessarabia in 1940.

Description 
The line stretched from the Baltic Sea to the Carpathian Mountains. It was made up of thirteen fortified regions, most covering about 100 km of the border, and formed a part of the larger Soviet defence network along its western borders, stretching from the Arctic Ocean to the Black Sea.

Each fortified region ( or UR) consisted of a large number of concrete bunkers (pillboxes) armed with machine-guns, antitank guns and artillery. The bunkers were built in groups for mutual support, each group forming a centre of resistance. A dedicated military unit was permanently assigned to man each region.

When the Axis powers attacked the Soviet Union on June 22, 1941 (Operation Barbarossa), most of the line remained unfinished, and hence posed a negligible obstacle to the invading forces.  Only the four southernmost regions, partly completed, were able to hamper the advance of the Wehrmacht for a few days. (The Brest Fortress resisted much longer, but it was an older fortification, and technically not part of the Molotov line).

The ruins of these fortifications, many of them well preserved, can be found today in Lithuania, Poland, Belarus and Ukraine. The modern borders are somewhat different from the borders in 1941, and hence some sections of the line do not lie in border zones and are easily accessible.  On the other hand, other sections do lie right along the modern Polish-Ukrainian, Polish-Belarusian and Lithuanian-Russian borders, so access to them may still be restricted for reasons of border security.

In Lithuania the line consisted of four fortified regions:
 1. Telšiai fortified region (line from Palanga to Judrėnai, 75 kilometers, 8 centers of resistance, 23 bunkers built and 366 under construction on June 22, 1941).
 2. Šiauliai fortified region (line from Pajūris to Jurbarkas, 90 kilometers, 6 centers of resistance, 27 bunkers built and 403 under construction).
 3. Kaunas fortified region (line from Jurbarkas to Kalvarija, 105 kilometers, 10 centers of resistance, 31 bunkers built and 599 under construction).
 4. Alytus fortified region (line from Kalvarija to border of Lithuanian SSR, 57 kilometers, 5 centers of resistance, 20 bunkers built and 273 under construction).

Overall 101 bunkers were built in Lithuania but many were not fully completed. They were significantly vulnerable and could be neutralised quickly by throwing grenades or burning fuel into periscope shafts, which were absolutely unprotected.

Continuing south, the other regions, today located along the eastern border of Poland with Belarus and Ukraine, were:
 5. Grodno fortified region – 80 km, 9 centers of resistance, 42/98/606 bunkers operational/built/under construction on June 22, 1941 (in Belarus and Poland)
 6. Osowiec fortified region – 60 km, 8 centers of resistance, 35/59/594 (in Poland)
 7. Zambrów fortified region – 70 km, 10 centers of resistance, 30/53/550 (in Poland)
 8. Brest  fortified region – 120 km, 10 centers of resistance, 49/128/380 (in Poland and Belarus)
 9. Kovel fortified region – 80 km, 9 centers of resistance, 138 bunkers under construction (in Ukraine)
 10. Volodymyr fortified region – 60 km, 7 centers of resistance,  97/97/141  (in Ukraine)
 11. Kamyanka-Buzka (Kamionka Strumiłowa) fortified region – 45 km, 5 centers of resistance,  84/84/180 (in Ukraine)
 12. Rawa Ruska fortified region – 90 km, 13 centers of resistance, 95/95/306 (in Poland and Ukraine)
 13. Przemyśl fortified region – 120 km, 9 centers of resistance, 99/99/186 over 140 bunkers were built (in Poland and Ukraine)

The name Molotov Line is informal and has come into use relatively recently. Viktor Suvorov popularised the term, notably in his book  Icebreaker.

See also 
 Stalin Line

Bibliography 
 Tomasz Bereza, Piotr Chmielowiec, Janusz Grechuta; W cieniu "Linii Mołotowa", [In the Shadow of the "Molotov Line"], published by Instytut Pamięci Narodowej (Institute of National Remembrance), Rzeszów 2002, pp. 262 .
 Neil Short, The Stalin and Molotov Lines: Soviet Western Defences 1926–41, Osprey Publishing, 2008,  (preview in Google Books)

External links 

 Molotov Line statistics
 http://bikelis.lt/tunelis/fortification/molotov/index.en.html – Molotov line pictures in Lithuania
 Molotov Line - the largest database with map and GPS positions (in Polish)

Molotov line bunkers visible in Google Street View 
 Raudeniškiai, Lithuania
 Alytus County, Lithuania
 Pajūris, Lithuania
 Tauragė, Lithuania
 Tauragė, Lithuania
Lipsk, Poland
Sulewo-Kownaty, Poland
Sulewo-Kownaty, Poland
Skłody Średnie, Poland
Wólka Zamkowa, Poland
Drohiczyn, Poland
Zajęczniki, Poland
Turna Duża, Poland
Turna Duża, Poland
 Przemyśl, Poland
 Przemyśl, Poland
 Przemyśl, Poland
 Przemyśl, Poland
 Przemyśl, Poland
 Ustyluh, Ukraine

References

World War II defensive lines
Historic defensive lines
Military history of the Soviet Union during World War II
Fortified regions of the Soviet Union
World War II sites in Lithuania
World War II sites in Poland
World War II sites in Belarus
World War II sites in Ukraine
Military locations of Lithuania